The 1997 Boise State Broncos football team represented Boise State University in the 1997 NCAA Division I-A football season. The Broncos competed in the Big West Conference and played their home games at Bronco Stadium in Boise, Idaho.

Schedule

References

Boise State
Boise State Broncos football seasons
Boise State Broncos football